Richard III (997/1001 – 6 August 1027) was the duke of Normandy who reigned from August 1026 to his death. His brief reign opened with a revolt by his brother.

Life
Richard III was the eldest son of Richard II of Normandy and Judith of Brittany. Around 1026, Richard was sent by his father in command of a large army to rescue his brother-in-law, Reginald, later Count of Burgundy, by attacking bishop and count Hugh of Chalon, who had captured and imprisoned Reginald in Chalon-sur-Saône.

When Richard II died in August 1026, his eldest son, Richard III became Duke of Normandy. Shortly after his reign began his brother Robert, discontented with his province of Hiemois on the border of Normandy, revolted against his brother. He laid siege to the town of Falaise, but was soon brought to heel by Richard who captured him, then released him on his oath of fealty. No sooner had Richard disbanded his army and returned to Rouen, when he died suddenly (some say suspiciously). The duchy passed to his younger brother Robert I.

Marriage
In January 1027, he was married to Adela, of a noble lineage.  She is usually identified with Adela, a younger daughter of King Robert II of France, who married to Baldwin V, Count of Flanders after Richard's 6 August 1027 death.

Issue
Richard's marriage to Adela was childless.

By an unknown woman, he had two children:
 Alice, who married Ranulph, Viscount of Bayeux
 Nicholas, monk at Fecamp, Abbot of Saint-Ouen Abbey, Rouen (died 26 Feb 1092)

References

1027 deaths
11th-century Dukes of Normandy
Norman warriors
Dukes of Normandy
House of Normandy